Erzurumlu Emrah (1775, Güzelyurt, Erzurum – 1854, Niksar, Tokat) was a Turkish Turkish folk poet.

Life
He took a madrasah education in Erzurum. He was interested in mysticism and adhered to the Halidi branch of Nakşibendi, lived in Sivas and Kastamonu for a long time. Important figures of poetic literature of the time were Karacaoğlan, Atik Ömer, Erzurumlu Emrah and Kayserili Aşık Seyrani. Erzurumlu Emrah is believed to have died in 1854 in Niksar. His poems of the aruz were published by Erzurumlu Abdulaziz under the title Divan.

See also
 Turkish folk literature

References

External links 
 Erzurumlu Emrah, Ministry of Culture in Turkey

Turkish poets
1775 births
1854 deaths
Date of birth unknown
Turkish-language writers
People from Güzelyurt